The 1862 Town of New Plymouth by-election was a by-election held  on 5 May in the  electorate during the 3rd New Zealand Parliament.

The by-election was caused by the resignation of the incumbent, William Richmond.

He was replaced by Isaac Newton Watt.

Watt was the only nomination, so was declared elected unopposed.

References

New Plymouth 1862
1862 elections in New Zealand
May 1862 events
Politics of Taranaki